was a well-known resident of Osaka who was both a scholar and a merchant. He was the able head clerk of the money exchange merchant Masuya. He studied Confucianism from Nakai Chikuzan and his brother Nakai Riken, and astronomy from Asada Goryu at the Kaitokudō School during its golden age. Despite his poor eyesight, he devoted 18 years to writing the book titled "Yumenoshiro" or "Instead of Dreams" which had as many as 12 volumes. In this book he supported the heliocentric theory, criticized the age of gods and advocated atheism. He played a pioneering role of bringing about modern thought in Japan and helped move it forward from its age old feudal system.

Osaka Prefecture recently established a prize of international culture named the Yamagata Banto Prize.

References

1748 births
1821 deaths
Japanese writers
Japanese atheists
18th-century Japanese astronomers
People from Takasago, Hyōgo
18th-century Japanese philosophers
19th-century Japanese philosophers